Bryan Keith "Dexter" Holland (born December 29, 1965) is an American musician, best known as the lead vocalist, rhythm guitarist, primary songwriter and last remaining original member of the punk rock band the Offspring. He is also the creator of the hot sauce Gringo Bandito, launched in 2004. In 2017, Holland attained a PhD in molecular biology.

Early life and education 
Holland attended Pacifica High School in Garden Grove, California, where he graduated as class valedictorian in 1984. During high school, Holland was the best student in mathematics in his year, and he found it "just as exciting as punk rock". 

He then attended the University of Southern California, where he earned a B.S. degree in biology, a M.S. degree in molecular biology, and eventually a Ph.D. in molecular biology in 2017. After the success of the Offspring, he suspended his studies to focus on music, but successfully resumed and defended his doctoral thesis in May 2017.

Holland's early musical influences include Aerosmith, the Beatles, the Sex Pistols, the Ramones, KISS, Bob Marley, Queen, and the Rolling Stones. In 1984, he started a punk band, Manic Subsidal, with his friend and cross-country teammate Greg K., Holland playing the drums. It formed after the duo failed to get into a Social Distortion concert. After Jim Benton was hired as their drummer, Holland switched to vocals and guitars. They never released any albums, but some demos have circulated online.

Music career 

After some line-up changes, including the addition of Noodles on guitar, Manic Subsidal changed their name to the Offspring in 1985. After recording a demo in 1988, the Offspring signed a deal with a small-time label, Nemesis Records, for whom they recorded their first full-length album, The Offspring, in March 1989. This album would eventually be re-issued on November 21, 1995, by Holland's own record label, Nitro Records.

In 1991, the Offspring signed with Epitaph Records (home of Bad Religion, L7, NOFX, Pennywise and other similar bands). Their first release on the label was Ignition, which was released in 1992. Their last album for that label was 1994's Smash, which still holds the world record for most sales of an album on an independent label. The band then signed with Columbia Records in 1996 (after Brett Gurewitz, owner of Epitaph and guitarist for Bad Religion, sold the contract to Columbia, Holland claims) for whom they released their next six albums, Ixnay on the Hombre (1997), Americana (1998), Conspiracy of One (2000), Splinter (2003), Rise and Fall, Rage and Grace (2008) and Days Go By (2012). Their most recent album, Let The Bad Times Roll (2021), was the band's first release on Concord Records. Holland is one of the two members (along with Noodles) to appear on all of The Offspring's albums, and as of Greg K.'s split from the band in November 2018, he is the only remaining original member left.

Holland sometimes plays the piano during live shows. Occasionally the band plays "Gone Away", with only Holland playing the song on piano. Holland sings in the tenor range.

He is also the co founder of the record label Nitro Records which he operated from 1994 to 2013.

Other ventures

Science 
In an interview in 1995, Holland said when he turns 40, he would rather be a professor at a university than play music.

Holland was a doctoral student at the Laboratory of Viral Oncology and Proteomics Research, Keck School of Medicine, where he was supervised by Professor Suraiya Rasheed. In March 2013, Holland and co-authors published a paper in PLoS One regarding microRNA in HIV genomes, titled "Identification of Human MicroRNA-Like Sequences Embedded within the Protein-Encoding Genes of the Human Immunodeficiency Virus". The original academic paper describes the use of computational molecular biological (in silico) approaches to identify microRNA-like sequences in HIV. These sequences are suggested to have evolved to self-regulate survival of the virus in the host by evading its immune responses and thus influence the persistence, replication, and pathogenicity of HIV. Holland was awarded his Ph.D. in molecular biology during the USC Commencement on May 12, 2017.

Gringo Bandito hot sauce 
In 2004, Holland launched his own brand of hot sauce, Gringo Bandito. The label depicts Holland with bandoliers, revolvers, a sombrero and shades, a design that OC Weekly magazine described as parodying the logo for Tapatío hot sauce or Pancho Villa. Holland, who grew up in Southern California where Mexican cuisine is considered a "part of the way of life", wondered "if [he] could do [a hot sauce] better".

On the conception of the hot sauce, Holland states that in the early 2000s, while eating Mexican food, he began to read the label of a bottle of Tapatío; "It just clicked that I had to make one. People who like hot sauce are a certain type of people. They're passionate. They'll have a bottle with them wherever they go. I'm one of those people. And when I'm into something, I really get into it. It's like my music—I liked records, so I learned how to play a guitar. After that? A band."

It has sold over a million bottles and is available in over 500 restaurants and 7,000 stores, including being a top-ranked hot sauce on Amazon.

The headquarters for Gringo Bandito are located in a Huntington Beach industrial park, next to the Offspring's recording studio.

Philanthropy 
In 1997, Holland and former Dead Kennedys singer Jello Biafra teamed up to form the F.S.U. Foundation, which raised funds through charity concerts. The foundation organized benefit shows to raise money for various charities including AIDS Project Los Angeles, Poor People's United Fund, Trees Foundation, and Amnesty International.

Holland participated in the 2006 and 2008 Los Angeles Marathon; his charity of choice was the Innocence Project, a non-profit legal clinic that handles legal cases where post-conviction DNA testing of evidence can yield conclusive proof of innocence.

Personal life 
Holland was married to hairstylist Kristine Luna. She co-wrote the song "Session" from the Ignition album and also appears in the Offspring music video "I Choose." Holland and Luna met in 1992, married in 1995, and divorced in 2012. He married Amber Sasse in 2013.

Holland has a daughter, Alexa Holland, from a previous relationship. She goes by the stage name Lex Land and is a singer-songwriter.

Holland is a licensed pilot. In November 2004, he completed a 10 day solo flight around the world.

Holland is also an avid collector of stamps from the Isle of Man. Other hobbies include surfing, as seen in the "Da Hui" music video.

Musical equipment 
All of Holland's Ibanez RG body guitars are made out of mahogany and fitted with DiMarzio Super Distortion bridge pickups. During their latest recordings, Holland used a vintage Gibson SG Junior. He plays through a Mesa Boogie Dual Rectifier.

Discography

The Offspring 
Holland appears on all ten of the Offspring's studio albums. For a comprehensive list, see The Offspring discography.

Guest appearances 
 The Vandals – Hitler Bad, Vandals Good (1998) (co-wrote "Too Much Drama")
 AFI – Black Sails in the Sunset (1999) (Backing vocals on "Clove Smoke Catharsis", "The Prayer Position" and "God Called in Sick Today")
 The Aquabats – The Aquabats vs. the Floating Eye of Death! (1999) (co-wrote "Amino Man!")
 The Vandals – Look What I Almost Stepped In... (2000) (co-wrote "Jackass" and does backing vocals on that song)
 Dwarves – The Dwarves Must Die (2004) (Backing vocals on "Salt Lake City" and "Massacre")
 Puffy AmiYumi – Splurge (2006) (co-wrote Tokyo I'm on My Way)
 Ron Emory – Walk That Walk (2010) (backing vocals on "I'm Not Alone")
 Dwarves – The Dwarves Are Born Again (2011) (Backing vocals on "Looking Out for Number One" and "Happy Birthday Suicide")
 Dwarves – The Dwarves Invented Rock & Roll (2014) (backing vocals)
 Dwarves – Take Back The Night (2018) (sings on "Julio")

Holland has also made cameo appearances in:
 Idle Hands (Movie, 1999) as Band lead singer (with The Offspring)
 Pauly Shore Is Dead (Movie, 2003) as Gas Station Guy
 Punk's Not Dead (Documentary, 2007) as himself
 One Nine Nine Four (Documentary, 2009) as himself
 The Damned: Don't You Wish That We Were Dead (Documentary, 2015) as himself
 The Last Sharknado: It's About Time (Movie, 2018) as British Captain

Publications

See also 
 List of artists and entertainers with advanced degrees

References

External links 

 
 
 Dexter Holland's Opus at Wayback Machine

1965 births
Alternative rock guitarists
Alternative rock singers
American alternative rock musicians
American male singers
Place of birth missing (living people)
American punk rock guitarists
American punk rock singers
American people of English descent
American tenors
American virologists
American bioinformaticians
Living people
American molecular biologists
Singers from California
People from Garden Grove, California
People from Huntington Beach, California
Rhythm guitarists
The Offspring members
University of Southern California alumni
Keck School of Medicine of USC alumni
Guitarists from California
American male guitarists
20th-century American guitarists
21st-century American guitarists
20th-century American singers
21st-century American singers
HIV/AIDS researchers
Aviators from California